Richard E. Sorensen is the former dean of both the Pamplin College of Business at Virginia Tech and Appalachian State University’s business school. He had been a dean for over 40 years. He is now a professor emeritus at Virginia Tech. 

He graduated from Brooklyn Polytechnic Institute with a BS, and did his MBA and PhD at NYU Stern. 

Several faculty fellowships and chair endowments are named after him. He was formally honored in the Virginia State Capitol by the Virginia General Assembly. AACSB International appointed him as special advisor.

References

Polytechnic Institute of New York University alumni
New York University Stern School of Business alumni
Year of birth missing (living people)
Living people